Sergio Mantovani (May 22, 1929 - February 23, 2001) was a racing driver from Milan, Italy. He entered 8 Formula One World Championship Grands Prix, debuting on September 13, 1953.  He started 7 of those races, all for Maserati. His best results were two fifth-place finishes, and he scored a total of 4 championship points.  In non-Championship F1 events, he finished third in the Syracuse and Rome Grands Prix in 1954.

After he lost a leg in a crash during practice for the Valentino Grand Prix in 1955, Mantovani retired and became involved with the Italian Sporting Commission.

Complete Formula One World Championship results
(key) 

* Indicates shared drive with Luigi Musso† Indicates shared drive with Luigi Musso and Harry Schell in Musso's car. Mantovani shared his own car with Musso and Jean Behra before it developed fuel system problems and was retired from the race.

References

Italian Formula One drivers
Maserati Formula One drivers
1929 births
2001 deaths
World Sportscar Championship drivers
Racing drivers from Milan
Carrera Panamericana drivers
Italian racing drivers